This is the list of cathedrals in Benin.

Roman Catholic 
Cathedrals of the Roman Catholic Church in Benin:
 Cathedral of Sts. Peter and Paul in Abomey
 Cathedral of Our Lady in Cotonou
 Cathédrale Notre-Dame de Fourvière in Dassa-Zoumé
 Cathedral of the Sacred Heart in Djougou
 Cathedral of Our Lady of Mount Carmel in Kandi
 Cathedral of St. Peter Claver in Lokossa
 Cathedral of St. Mark the Evangelist in N'Dali
 Cathedral of the Immaculate Conception in Natitingou
 Cathedral of Sts. Peter and Paul in Parakou
 Cathedral of the Immaculate Conception in Porto Novo

See also
List of cathedrals
Christianity in Benin

References

Cathedrals in Benin
Benin
Cathedrals
Cathedrals